Weston Road is a north–south street in the west end of Toronto and western York Region in Ontario, Canada. The road is named for the former Village of Weston, which was located near Weston Road and Lawrence Avenue West.

Route description

In the south, Weston Road begins at St. Clair Avenue opposite the north end of the southern leg of Keele Street. The southernmost 55 metres of the street north of St. Clair, where the roadway diverted to the west off its straight baseline, was formerly a part of Keele, which officially breaks here and is cut off from its northern section. Weston Road formerly began at the diversion, but this stretch of Keele St. was redesignated as part of Weston Road in 2006. 
Weston Road then travels diagonally across the general arterial road grid in a northwesterly direction to Highway 401, passing through Mount Dennis at Eglinton Avenue, and Weston north of Lawrence Avenue. North of the 401, it becomes a normal grid road and runs parallel to Highway 400 to Steeles Avenue and into Vaughan in York Region.

Most of Weston Road is a four-lane principal arterial road through residential areas, except for the northern section which is mostly industrial. The speed limit south of Finch Avenue is 50 km/h (30 mph), which increases to 60 km/h (35 mph) between Finch and Steeles.

North of the Toronto city limits at Steeles Avenue, Weston Road enters York Region, where it is designated as York Regional Road 56. It passes through the two western municipalities of York Region, Vaughan in the south and King in the north. The speed limit through the urbanized parts of Vaughan is 60 km/h (35 mph), while the limit is 80 km/h (50 mph) in rural Vaughan and King Township. The northern terminus of the road is at Highway 9 in the Holland Marsh.

History

Weston Road was first laid out in the first decade of the 1800s to connect Dundas Street to the village of Weston. This followed the route of what is today Old Weston and (west of Watts Avenue) Rogers Roads, then the route of the current Weston Road north to Weston. The old routing was renamed in 1948. Between 1810 and 1820, it was extended north to Vaughan Township by following Sixth Line West. In 1841, the route was bought by private interests and it became the "Weston Plank Road", a toll road of planks. The Weston Plank Road extended from Dundas Street north to Musson's Bridge over the Humber, where  Albion Road began. The company built its headquarters at St. Phillips Road and Weston Road. The building exists today at 2371 Weston Road. In 1846, the Weston Plank Road Company built Albion Plank Road from Musson's bridge northwest to Clairville where one could continue north to Bolton via Indian Line. In the 1850s, the roads were assumed by the township and its municipalities.

Old Weston Road(s)

Additionally, there are two bypassed "Old Weston Roads"; the first being located in the environs of the southern terminus. It begins as a minor stub running north from intersection of Dundas and Dupont Streets, and breaks at the Canadian Pacific tracks, which were bridged until the 1970s. It resumes just south of the western terminus of Davenport Road, widens to four lanes, passes through the neighbourhood of Silverthorne, and ends at Rogers Road, the westernmost section of which also formed part of the original Weston Road, before the construction of the new Weston Road course south of Rogers Road's present terminus.    

The second is located in Vaughan, just north of Steeles Ave, and was created when a jog was eliminated in the 1990s. It lies just east of the linking segment where it continues south as Signet Drive (built as a southerly extension of the offset York Region section), and ends at a T-intersection with Weston Road two blocks north of Steeles.

Public transit

Two bus routes serve Weston Road: 89 Weston (serving the stretch from Albion Road to St. Clair Avenue West, then via Keele Street to Keele subway station) and 165 Weston Road North (serving from Steeles Avenue West to the stretch from Albion Road, then via Wilson Avenue to Wilson station and York Mills station). One express bus route serve Weston Road: 989 Weston Express (serving between Keele station and Steeles Avenue West).

North of Steeles Avenue, York Region Transit route 165 Weston serves Weston Road, running from Pioneer Village station to Major Mackenzie Drive in Vaughan.

In popular culture
The road is mentioned in Toronto native Drake's 2016 song "Weston Road Flows", and his 2018 song "God's Plan".

See also

List of numbered roads in York Region

References

External links
Google Maps of Weston Road
Google Maps of Old Weston Road

Roads in Toronto
Transport in King, Ontario
Transport in Vaughan
Plank road